was a  after Kyōtoku and before Chōroku. This period spanned the years from July 1455 through September 1457.

Change of Era
 1455 : The era name was changed to mark an event or a number of events.

Events of the Kōshō era
 1456 (Kōshō 2, 3rd month): Ashikaga Yoshimasa visited Iwashimizu Shrine; and all the officials of the Daijō-kan joined him in going there.
 1456 (Kōshō 2, 8th month): The father of Emperor Go-Hanazono, Fushimi-no-miya-shinnō Sadafusa, died at age 85.

Notes

References
 Nussbaum, Louis Frédéric and Käthe Roth. (2005). Japan Encyclopedia. Cambridge: Harvard University Press. ; OCLC 48943301
 Titsingh, Isaac. (1834). Nihon Odai Ichiran; ou,  Annales des empereurs du Japon.  Paris: Royal Asiatic Society, Oriental Translation Fund of Great Britain and Ireland. OCLC 5850691

External links
 National Diet Library, "The Japanese Calendar" -- historical overview plus illustrative images from library's collection

Japanese eras
1450s in Japan